Lena Sjöholm (born 7 August 1946) represented Sweden internationally at archery.

Career 

Sjöholm competed in the 1973 and 1975 World Archery Championships in the women's individual and team events.

She finished thirteenth in the women's individual event at the 1976 Summer Olympics
with a score of 2322 points.

References

External links 

 Profile on worldarchery.org
 Profile on sok.se

1946 births
Living people
Swedish female archers
Olympic archers of Sweden
Archers at the 1976 Summer Olympics
Sportspeople from Malmö
20th-century Swedish women